Hunnu Air is a Mongolian domestic airline that began scheduled flights in 2011. The company changed its name from Mongolian Airlines Group in April 2013 to avoid confusion with the similarly named Mongolian international flag carrier MIAT Mongolian Airlines.  The company slogan is Wings of Mongolia. The name Hunnu refers to the Mongolian spelling of the Xiongnu.

History 
Hunnu Air is backed by the mining company Mongolyn Alt (MAK) Group and the Bodi Group. The airline was launched as Mongolian Airlines on 2 December 2011 following the acquisition of Monnis Air Services and its fleet of Antonov An-2 single-engine biplane aircraft. Confusion soon arose over the name and its similarity to that of MIAT Mongolian Airlines and in April 2013, threatened with a legal dispute and possible government intervention, the name was changed to Hunnu Air.

The airline purchased two Fokker 50 aircraft in 2011 and operated its first scheduled domestic flight (from Ulaanbaatar to Bayankhongor) on 2 January 2012. Other domestic routes were later opened from Ulaanbaatar to Mörön, Choibalsan, Khvod and Dalanzadgad. With the leasing of two Airbus A319 aircraft, delivered in January 2012, it was able to launch services to Tokyo and subsequently Bangkok, Shanghai and Hong Kong. In July 2013 a third Fokker 50 was acquired. Hunnu Air also operated charter flights to destinations such as Jeju, Hainan and Shizuoka.

Hunnu Air introduced its first long-haul direct flight from Ulaanbaatar to Paris for the summer period of 2014, with one technical stop, using an Airbus A319. The airline planned to acquire an Airbus A330 aircraft and relaunch long-haul direct flights in 2015 to include Singapore. The two Airbus A319s were repossessed by their owner late in 2014, putting plans for expansion in doubt.

Destinations 

Hunnu Air operates within Mongolia and Central Asia from its Chinggis Khaan International Airport base.

Fleet

Current fleet
 
, the Hunnu Air fleet includes the following aircraft:

Former fleet
The airline previously operated the following aircraft:
 Airbus A319
 Fokker 50

References

Airlines of Mongolia
Airlines established in 2011
Companies based in Ulaanbaatar